This is a list of Turkish Members of Parliament who did not seek re-election in the June 2015 general election. Only MPs who have not applied for renomination are listed. MPs of the 24th Parliament who applied to become candidates but failed to make it onto their party's lists are not included.

AKP three-term limit
A Justice and Development Party (AKP) by-law dictates that members of parliament can only serve 3 successive terms from AKP lists. Therefore, 70 of AKP's 312 MPs will have to stand down in the 2015 elections, which includes 9 members of the Davutoğlu Cabinet and other prominent AKP people who have been MPs since 2002. A farewell ceremony and feast was held on 31 March 2015 for the outgoing MPs who had served for three terms.

HDP two-term limit
The Peoples' Democratic Party (HDP) party constitution imposes a two-term limit on elected members who have served under the banner of the HDP or its predecessor Peace and Democracy Party (BDP). This means that eight HDP MPs who served throughout the 24th Parliament cannot stand for re-election. The members who are barred from standing due to the two-term limit are as follows.

MPs not seeking re-election
The following MPs who were able to stand again for their party, but decided not to seek re-election.

Justice and Development Party

Republican People's Party

Nationalist Movement Party

Independents

References

June 2015 Turkish general election